Jyoti Khandelwal is an Indian National Congress politician who was elected mayor of Jaipur Municipal Corporation in 2009. In those elections, she defeated Suman Sharma of the Bharatiya Janata Party by 13,500 votes.

In her tenure she has courted many controversies, often sparring with opposition councillors. During her tenure as Mayor, she criticized the Congress led state government for sheltering "corrupt".

In 2019, Khandelwal became the first woman candidate in 48 years to contest the Lok Sabha election from Jaipur. According to her, she enjoys popular women support in Jaipur because of her active involvement with the women in social, cultural and religious events in the city.

References

External links 

Indian National Congress politicians from Rajasthan
Politicians from Jaipur
Rajasthan municipal councillors
Mayors of places in Rajasthan
Women mayors of places in Rajasthan
Living people
Place of birth missing (living people)
21st-century Indian women politicians
21st-century Indian politicians
1974 births